The 1996 Trans-Am Series was the 31st season of the Sports Car Club of America's Trans-Am Series.

Results

References

Trans-Am Series
1996 in American motorsport